Știința means "science" in Romanian language. When transliterated from Moldovan Cyrillic alphabet, it may be spelled Shtiintsa.

The word may refer to:

Editura Știința, a publishing house in Moldavian SSR and Moldova
Sports clubs associated with various academic or student bodies:
Știința Bacău (disambiguation) 
FC Știința Bacău, a Romanian football club 
CS Știința Bacău,  a Romanian women handball club
HCM Știința Baia Mare,  a Romanian women handball club
Știința Cluj, a former name for FC Universitatea Cluj
Știința Craiova, former name and current nickname for CS Universitatea Craiova
Știința, a Romanian student sports club, the precursor of FC Sportul Studenţesc București
Știința Timişoara, a former name for FC Politehnica Timișoara